Sidi Rahal Chatai is a coastal town in the Casablanca-Settat region of Morocco. It is located 33 kilometers west of Casablanca. It recorded a population of 20,628 in the 2014 Moroccan census. It is a popular area for surfing especially in winter, as there is a consistent surf. It is a popular destination for Casablanca residents to spend their summer holidays.

References 

Populated places in Berrechid Province
Municipalities of Morocco